The Middle of Nowhere is a 2005 release by American heavy metal band Circle II Circle. It was the band's second studio release, but the first featuring the new band assembled after Stevens fired the original band in 2003. Like the band's first record, it features guest appearances and writing credits for Stevens's former Savatage band mates, Jon Oliva and Chris Caffery. The Japanese edition of the album features three bonus tracks. One track was a live performance of the title track from the band's previous release, Watching in Silence. The other two tracks were previously released on the All That Remains EP.

Track listing 
All songs on this album are within the five-minute song length.

 "In This Life" (Bernd Aufferman, Stevens) – 5:42
 "All That Remains" (Oliva, Stevens) – 5:12
 "Open Season" (Caffery, Stevens) – 5:45
 "Holding On" (Oliva, Stevens) – 5:45
 "Cynical Ride" (Caffery, Stevens) – 5:33
 "Hollow" (Oliva, Stevens) – 5:00
 "Psycho Motor" (Oliva, Stevens) – 5:15
 "Faces in the Dark" (Caffery, Stevens) – 5:33
 "The Middle of Nowhere" (Oliva, Stevens) – 5:35
 "Lost" (Aufferman, Stevens) – 5:05
 "Watching in Silence" (Live) – 4:36 (Digipak and Japan bonus track)
 "Strung Out" (Japan bonus track) – 5:24
 "Shadows" (Japan bonus track) – 4:50

Personnel 
 Zachary Stevens – lead vocals, keyboards
 Evan Christopher – guitars, backing vocals
 Andrew Lee – guitars, backing vocals
 Mitch Stewart – bass, backing vocals
 Tom Drennan – drums, backing vocals

Production 
 Recorded at Morrisound Studios in Tampa Bay, Florida, 2004–2005
 Executive producer: Dan Campbell
 Producer: Zachary Stevens
 Co-produced and engineered by Jim Morris
 Mixed and mastered: Morris / Stevens / Campbell
 Cover concept: Campbell / Stevens
 Design and artwork: Dan Campbell / Thomas Ewerhard
 Management: Dan Campbell / Global Artists Inc.

References 

2005 albums
Circle II Circle albums
AFM Records albums